Platte Township may refer to:

 Platte Township, Taylor County, Iowa
 Platte Township, Union County, Iowa, in Union County, Iowa
 Platte Township, Michigan
 Platte Township, Morrison County, Minnesota
 Platte Township, Andrew County, Missouri
 Platte Township, Buchanan County, Missouri
 Platte Township, Clay County, Missouri
 Platte Township, Clinton County, Missouri
 Platte Township, Buffalo County, Nebraska
 Platte Township, Butler County, Nebraska
 Platte Township, Dodge County, Nebraska
 Platte Township, Charles Mix County, South Dakota, in Charles Mix County, South Dakota

Township name disambiguation pages